Pushpanjali (Sanskrit:पुष्पाञ्जलि, literally folded hands full of flowers) is an offering of flowers to Hindu deities.

Pushpanjali is the first dance in a Bharatnatyam performance. It is the salutation to the lord of dance Nataraja, the Guru, the musicians and the audience.

It is made up of 2 words. 
Pushpa - flower
Anjali - folded hands to show respect.

The dancer holds flower to offer prayers to the  Trinity of Gods, goddesses, ashta dikpalakas, and scholars in dance.

Puja (Hinduism)
Elements of a Bharatanatyam performance